The year 1760 in science and technology involved some significant events.

Chemistry
 Louis Claude Cadet de Gassicourt investigates inks based on cobalt salts and isolates cacodyl from cobalt mineral containing arsenic, pioneering work in organometallic chemistry.

Geology
 John Michell suggests earthquakes are caused by one layer of rocks rubbing against another.

Medicine
 April 30 – Swiss mathematician Daniel Bernoulli presents a paper at the French Academy of Sciences in Paris in which "a mathematical model was used for the first time to study the population dynamics of infectious disease."
 Samuel-Auguste Tissot publishes L'Onanisme in Lausanne, a treatise on the supposed ill-effects of masturbation.

Physics
 Johann Heinrich Lambert publishes Photometria, a pioneering work in photometry, including a formulation of the Beer–Lambert law on light absorption and the introduction of the albedo as a reflection coefficient.

Events
 Mathematician Leonhard Euler begins writing his Letters to a German Princess (Lettres à une princesse d'Allemagne sur divers sujets de physique et de philosophie) to Friederike Charlotte of Brandenburg-Schwedt and her younger sister Louise.

Awards
 Copley Medal: Benjamin Wilson

Births
 April 13 – Thomas Beddoes, reforming English physician (died 1808)
 June 5 – Johan Gadolin, Finnish chemist and mineralogist (died 1852)
 October 23 – Hanaoka Seishū, Japanese surgeon (died 1835)
 Clelia Durazzo Grimaldi, Italian botanist (died 1830)

Deaths
 September 11 – Louis Godin, French astronomer (born 1704)

References

 
18th century in science
1760s in science